Hesperian Press is a locally owned and operated book publisher located in Perth, Western Australia.

Peter Bridge first published technical material in 1969.

The business of Hesperian Press in its current format started in 1979. The Press republishes out of print books together with new texts, as can be seen from the catalogue.

It has also published facsimiles of early out-of-print Western Australian books, and the writings of early Australian explorers.

It continues to produce otherwise difficult to trace items.

Notes

External links
 

Book publishing companies of Australia
Western Australian literature